Pamela Theodora Weston (17 October 1921 – 9 September 2009) was a British clarinetist, teacher and writer.

Born in London, she attended Priors Field School. Following two years at the Royal Academy of Music she won a scholarship to the Guildhall School of Music before studying privately with the noted clarinetist Frederick Thurston. She was a professor of clarinet at the Guildhall from 1951 until 1969. She organised the  International Clarinet Association Congress in 1984, the first ever held in the United Kingdom.

Weston's legacy continues in the form of a scholarship for clarinet research at doctoral level, available from the Royal College of Music, recognising the institution's pre-emininence in this area, across both practice and theory.

Publications
Her first book, Clarinet Virtuosi of the Past, published in 1971, was followed by The Clarinet Teacher's Companion (1976), More Clarinet Virtuosi of the Past (1977), Clarinet Virtuosi of Today (1989) and Yesterday's Clarinettists: A Sequel (2002). Weston also published numerous articles in professional journals associated with the clarinet, both in the UK and abroad. She has also written for The Cambridge Companion to the Clarinet.

Death
Suffering in her last years from debilitating myalgic encephalomyelitis, she travelled to Switzerland to undertake an assisted suicide at the age of 87 in 2009.

References

1921 births
2009 suicides
British clarinetists
Academics of the Guildhall School of Music and Drama
Drug-related suicides in Switzerland
Musicians from London
Alumni of the Guildhall School of Music and Drama
People with chronic fatigue syndrome
Deaths by euthanasia